Burj Al Babas is an abandoned residential development located near Mudurnu, Turkey with 732 nearly identical houses, each designed to resemble a miniature chateau. The site, under development by the Sarot Group, was abandoned in 2019 after the developers filed for bankruptcy with a debt of $25 million.

Original concept 
Burj Al Babas is a housing development project owned by Istanbul construction entrepreneurs The Yerdelen brothers. The project involved the construction of 732 three-story luxury villas, all very similar to each other and characterised by elements of Gothic, English and American architecture. Meanwhile, the cylindrical towers with dormer windows and the square towers with balustrades were inspired in particular by the Galata Tower in Istanbul, built in the late Middle Ages by the Genoese, and by the so-called Maiden's Tower, located on an island in the Bosphorus Strait, a few hundred metres from the city.

According to the original brochure, the centre of the complex was to include a domed structure containing a shopping centre, health and beauty facilities such as Turkish baths, a mosque, a movie theatre, and other facilities open to residents.

The houses were on sale for between $370,000 and $530,000.

Aiming for the Arab market, the partners named the development the Burj Al Babas Thermal Tourism Company and began marketing the houses through their real estate agency in Kuwait.

The site in the Black Sea region of Turkey was situated near the region's hot springs. Excavations on the site revealed that 200 meters underground, the water temperature reached 68 degrees Celsius or 154 degrees Fahrenheit.

Complications 
Construction began on the complex in 2014. Using 2,500 workers, the developers aimed to finish the project in four years. The development was originally successful with approximately half of the castles selling in advance. 

In 2018 sales eventually stalled, causing the developer to enter bankruptcy. Falling oil prices and instability in Turkey were cited as reasons for the slump in sales. The mayor of Mudurnu, Mehmet Inegol, remained confident that the project would begin again. 

As of 2021, however, 587 of the planned 732 homes were started, with very few reaching the landscaping phase. None were finished.

In popular culture
Burj Al Babas is the setting for the music video of "Lose Control", a 2019 song by Meduza, Becky Hill and Goodboys.

The music video for "Sober" by French electronic musician SebastiAn was partially shot in Burj Al Babas.

Gaspard Augé, also a French electronic musician, shot two music videos for "Belladone" and the title track from his 2021 album Escapades in Burj Al Babas.

The rapper Quadeca used this location in the music video for the song "Fractions of Infinity" featuring Sunday Service Choir.

The YouTube channel STORROR filmed an episode of Hide and Seek in Burj Al Babas in 2023.

References

Buildings and structures in Turkey
Unfinished buildings and structures
Ghost towns in Asia
Ghost towns in Europe
Mudurnu District